Anaconda (also known as Anacondas) is an American horror film series created by Hans Bauer, Jim Cash and Jack Epps Jr. Produced and distributed by Sony Pictures Home Entertainment, the series began with Anaconda (1997) directed by Luis Llosa, and was followed by one theatrical stand-alone sequel, Anacondas: The Hunt for the Blood Orchid (2004) directed by Dwight Little, and three television sequels, Anaconda 3: Offspring (2008), Anacondas: Trail of Blood (2009), both directed by Don E. FauntLeRoy, and Lake Placid vs. Anaconda (2015) directed by A.B. Stone and being a crossover with the Lake Placid film series. Each installment revolves around giant man-eating anacondas and the efforts of various groups of people to capture or destroy the creatures. The fictional plant known as the Blood Orchid and the company Wexel Hall Pharmaceuticals as well as the fictitious Murdoch family are repeatedly referenced in the films.

Films

Anaconda (1997) 

When a documentary crew traveling through the Amazon jungle picks up a stranded man, they are unaware of the trouble that will occur. This stranger's hobby is to capture the giant Anaconda snake, and plans to continue targeting it on their boat.

Anacondas: The Hunt for the Blood Orchid (2004) 

A scientific expedition sets out for Borneo to seek a flower called the Blood Orchid, which could grant longer life. Meanwhile, they run afoul of snakes and each other.

Anaconda 3: Offspring (2008) 

A team of mercenaries join forces with a herpetologist and an assistant from the billionaire owner who both worked in a genetic research lab, Wexel Hall, to capture the snakes after they escaped from the lab, until they find themselves needing to stop them before it's too late.

Anacondas: Trail of Blood (2009) 

A herpetologist is on a mission to destroy the Blood Orchid from the billionaire who wanted a serum to cure his cancer, until a dangerous snake threatens everyone.

Lake Placid vs. Anaconda (2015) 

In Black Lake, Maine, an accident allows the two giant species, crocodiles and anacondas to be regenerated and escape towards to Clear Lake. Now, Reba teams up with Tully to find his daughter Bethany and a group of sorority girls in a deadly match between the two creatures.

Future 
In January 2020, Sony Pictures announced a reboot is in development, with Evan Daugherty serving as screenwriter.

Cast and crew

Cast 
 An  indicates an appearance through archival footage.
 A dark gray cell indicates the character was not in the film.

Crew

Reception

Box office performance

Critical response

Music

Soundtracks

Other media

Novelization 
Anaconda: The Writer's Cut is a novel by Hans Bauer published in 2014. Bauer also wrote the screenplay for the 1997 film Anaconda and its 2004 sequel Anacondas: The Hunt for the Blood Orchid.

Video games 
 Quake Anaconda Mod (1997)
Promoting the original film's release, Sony released a free total conversion mod for Quake Mission Pack No. 1: Scourge of Armagon, which featured new snake enemies and a large Anaconda boss character.

 Anacondas Arcade Game (2004)
Anacondas Arcade Game is an online interactive game produced by Sony Studios in 2004 to promote the film Anacondas: The Hunt for the Blood Orchid from the same year.

 Anacondas 3D: Adventure Game (2004)
Anacondas 3D: Adventure Game is an online interactive game produced by Sony Studios in 2004 to promote the film Anacondas: The Hunt for the Blood Orchid from the same year.

 Snakes on a Babe (2008)
Snakes on a Babe is an online interactive game produced in 2008 to promote the film Anaconda 3: Offspring from the same year.

References 

 
Film series introduced in 1997
Horror film series
Columbia Pictures franchises
Sony Pictures franchises
Jungle adventure films